Reservation Dogs is an Indigenous American television series created by Sterlin Harjo and Taika Waititi for FX Productions. It is the first series to feature all Indigenous writers and directors, along with an almost entirely Indigenous North American cast and production team. It is also the first series to be filmed entirely in Oklahoma. The series premiered on Hulu under FX on Hulu branding on August 9, 2021 (International Day of the World's Indigenous Peoples). It was renewed for a second season in 2021 and a third season in 2022.

Reservation Dogs has received widespread critical acclaim and numerous accolades, including a Peabody Award, two Independent Spirit Awards, and nominations for the Critics' Choice Television Awards and Golden Globes, and was named one of the best series of 2021 and 2022 by many critics. In addition, the American Film Institute named it one of the ten best television programs of 2021 and 2022.

Premise
The series follows the lives of four Indigenous teenagers in rural Oklahoma, as they spend their days committing crime and fighting it. After the death of their friend Daniel one year prior to the events of the series, the gang wrestles with a desire to move to California, the way Daniel dreamed of doing. But first they need to tie up loose ends in their lives and community and make preparations to leave.

In Season 2, the Rez Dogs are still experiencing grief over the loss of their friend, now compounded by the foursome being broken apart and scattered, and missing each other. The "California dream" does not turn out the way they expected, resulting in more feelings of disappointment and abandonment. While they cope using humor, they also face increasingly more adult challenges. Financial and family responsibilities arise as they continue to try to figure out their lives.

Cast and characters

Main
 Devery Jacobs as Elora Danan Postoak, Named for the Willow character, she is the most responsible and driven member of the gang. Elora lost her mother when she was still a toddler.
 D'Pharaoh Woon-A-Tai as Bear Smallhill, Bear sees himself as the "leader" of the gang, despite being the only one of the group to think so. He grew up with only his mother parenting him and is still very close to her. He longs for a relationship with his estranged, deadbeat dad. Bear experiences visions of a spirit guide.
 Lane Factor as Chester "Cheese" Williams, More laid back than Elora or Bear, he rolls with the flow of whatever mischief or misadventure comes his way. He lives with his "cousin uncle", Charley; Cheese tends to connect with various adult characters in the show. 
 Paulina Alexis as Wilhelmina "Willie Jack" Jacqueline Sampson, A tomboy, she is very close with her parents. Daniel was Willie Jack's cousin and she is strongly affected by his death.

Recurring
 Sarah Podemski as Rita, Bear's mother. A devoted single parent, Rita works at the local Indian Health Service (IHS) clinic and frequently fields advances from male admirers. She is determined to find a man who can be a better father figure to Bear than Punkin.
 Zahn McClarnon as Officer Big; a lighthorseman known for his patience with petty criminals as well as for his superstitious nature.
 Dallas Goldtooth as William "Spirit" Knifeman; a self-proclaimed warrior who died at The Battle of Little Big Horn, even though he did not do any fighting; he has been sent to act as a guide to Bear.
 Gary Farmer as Uncle Brownie, Elora's uncle While his former bar fights are legendary, he now lives in the woods as a hermit.
 Elva Guerra as Jackie, leader of the NDN mafia; she grew up in the city and wants to return to urban life.
 Lil Mike as Mose, half of a local rap duo along with his brother; they ride around the community on their bikes, keeping track of local gossip and commenting on events.
 Funny Bone as Mekko, the other half of the local rap duo.
 Jack Maricle as White Steve, member of the NDN mafia.
 Jude Barnett as Bone Thug Dog, member of the NDN mafia.
 Xavier Bigpond as Weeze, member of the NDN mafia.
 Dalton Cramer as Daniel, Willie Jack's late cousin and friend of the Rez Dogs, who died a year before the start of the show.
 Bobby Lee as Dr. Kang, the primary physician at the tribal clinic.
 Kirk Fox as Kenny Boy, owner of the local salvage yard; constantly trying to convince people he is Native American, interspersing his speech with mispronounced and misunderstood words and concepts in Navajo, Lakota, and Ojibwe, much to the annoyance of actual Natives.
 Matty Cardarople as Ansel, a worker at the local salvage yard.
 Jon Proudstar as Leon, Willie Jack's father. Since the loss of his nephew, he has become overprotective of Willie Jack.
 Kimberly Guerrero as Auntie B, Willie Jack's aunt, a paranoid beadworker.
 Jana Schmieding as Bev, the clinic receptionist and Jackie's aunt.
 Casey Camp-Horinek as Irene, the grandmother Cheese meets at the clinic.
 Kaniehtiio Horn as Deer Lady, a spirit in the form of a beautiful woman with deer hooves.
 Geraldine Keams as Mabel, Elora's grandmother
 Jennifer Podemski as Willie Jack's mom
 Tamara Podemski as Teenie, Elora's aunt
 Wes Studi as Bucky, an eccentric local artist
 Richard Ray Whitman as Old Man Fixico
 Bobby Wilson as Jumbo, who works at the weed dispensary	
 Migizi Pensoneau as Ray Ray, Jumbo's good friend
 Warren Queton as Clinton, Rita's boss at the IHS Clinic
 Nathan Apodaca, as Uncle Charley, the "cousin uncle" Cheese lives with
 Keland Lee Bearpaw as Danny Bighead
 Macon Blair as Rob
 Darryl W. Handy as Cleo
 Rhomeyn Johnson as Miles

Guest
 Lily Gladstone as Hokti, Daniel's mom and Willie Jack's auntie, a medicine woman who is currently in prison
 Janae Collins as Cookie, Elora's mom and close friend of the Aunties and Big; died young but seen in flashbacks
 Garrett Hedlund as David
 Natalie Standingcloud as Natalie, one of the Aunties
 Tafv Sampson as Gram, an ancestor of Willie Jack and Hokti, who now watches and helps them as a spirit. She walked the Trail of Tears and, in the afterlife, is in a hot sexual relationship with William Knifeman
 Sten Joddi as Punkin Lusty, Bear's estranged father, a rapper living in California
 Bill Burr as Garrett Bobson (Chukogee), Elora's former basketball coach and driving instructor
 Brandon Boyd as White Jesus of Los Angeles
 Amber Midthunder as MissMa8riarch, alleged online influencer, youth seminar leader; claims to be many things. 
 Elisha Pratt as Augusto Firekeeper, self-described "actor, model, poet, hatmaker", etc.
 Joy Harjo as Manager of the convenience store where Elora works
 Megan Mullally as Anna
 Michael Spears as Danny, Daniel's father
 Marc Maron as Gene, head of a foster home, who "spends his days harassing and trauma-dumping on Native youth."

Episodes

Season 1 (2021)

Season 2 (2022)

Production

Development
The series was first reported on in November 2019 and was confirmed by Taika Waititi on Twitter shortly after. The initial report announced that Waititi would be co-writing the series with Native American filmmaker Sterlin Harjo, who would also share executive producer and directing duties with Waititi. After the pilot had been shot in Okmulgee, Oklahoma, FX announced a series order for the project in December 2020. The casting for the four lead actors, D'Pharaoh Woon-A-Tai, Devery Jacobs, Paulina Alexis, and newcomer Lane Factor, was also confirmed at this time, alongside a group of guest stars to be featured in the pilot episode. Filming sites for principal photography for season one, which had wrapped by July 2021, included Okmulgee, Tulsa, Sand Springs, Beggs, Inola, and Terlton, all in northeast Oklahoma. On September 2, 2021, FX renewed the series for a second season, also filmed on location in Okmulgee.

Discussing their creative partnership and respective roles in the production, Waititi stressed, "I really believe people need to tell their own stories and especially from whatever area they are from", leading to Harjo, who is from Oklahoma, taking the lead on the project and Waititi taking a more supporting role. Additionally, many of the storylines in the show are inspired by events from Harjo's childhood.

Part of the development process included casting unknown actors from Indigenous communities, and the young leads in particular forming a working rapport, often around their shared love of Indigenous comedy. Jacobs and Alexis added that they bonded over their mutual appreciation of the sketch comedy group 1491s. Four of the five members of the 1491s worked on season one of the series, and with the addition of Ryan RedCorn to the writers' room for season two, all of the 1491s are now working on Reservation Dogs as writers and actors, directors, or producers. On September 22, 2022, FX renewed  the series for a third season.

Release
The series premiered on FX on Hulu in the United States on August 9, 2021. In international markets, it is distributed through the Star hub of the Disney+ streaming service. In Latin America, the series premiered as a Star+ original. In India, all eight episodes of season 1 premiered on Disney+ Hotstar on October 2, 2021.

Reception

Critical response

Season 1
The first season received critical acclaim. On the review aggregator website Rotten Tomatoes, it received a "Certified Fresh" approval rating of 98% with an average score of 8.2 out of 10, based on 57 reviews. The site's critical consensus reads: "Aimless afternoons yield absurd delights in Reservation Dogs, a low-key comedy that deftly captures the malaise of youth and Rez life thanks in no small part to its impressive central crew." On Metacritic, which uses a weighted average, it received a score of 83 out of 100, based on 22 reviews, indicating "universal acclaim."

Writing for The Guardian, Ellen E Jones gave the show a rating of 5 out of 5 and said, "Reservation Dogs is able to lay waste stylishly to centuries of myth and misrepresentation due to one simple, crucial, innovation: almost everyone involved in the production is a Native American, offering a perspective which never panders to the often-fetishising gaze of outsiders. Instead, this show tells of the push-pull of home: that simultaneous yearning to both belong and be free." Candice Frederick of TV Guide rated the series 4 out of 5, based on the first four episodes and said, "Though it wrestles with some heavy, but not overtly political, themes, Reservation Dogs seems to mostly have fun with young life on a reservation." In another 4 out 5 rating, Alan Sepinwall, writing for Rolling Stone, said, "a show like Reservation Dogs feels long overdue. And this exact show? It's awfully good." Paste magazine's Allison Keene gave a rating of 9.2 out of 10 and called the series "a perfect summer series, one that takes places on languid afternoons and moves at an unhurried pace."

Reviewing the first two episodes, Danette Chavez of The A.V. Club gave it a "B+" and said, "Reservation Dogs is already on track to be one of the best comedies (and shows) of the year." Kristen Lopez of IndieWire also gave it a grade of "B+", saying, "[Reservation Dogs] is a surprising series that illustrates why everyone's story is worth telling" and also praised the four main actors, stating that "the teens assembled here are all fantastic, conveying so much about their characters' true selves even if they don't know it yet." Voxs Emily St. James also praised the main actors, calling them "one of the best ensembles of teen characters in recent memory" and regarded the first season as "one of the best first seasons of a comedy in some time." Daniel Fienberg of The Hollywood Reporter also praised the cast as well as the "triumph" representation of the Native Americans.

The New Yorkers Doreen St. Félix wrote, "Reservation Dogs is a mood piece, and a sweet one, a collection of intertwined and poetic portraiture that focuses not solely on the central cast". Daniel D'Addario of Variety said, "Reservation Dogs is a lovely, eminently watchable triumph. It's an overdue tribute to a sort of community it doesn't mythologize. Instead, the show treats the reservation and its residents on their own terms, as worthy of being explored for just what it is, and just who they are." Polygons Joshua Rivera praised the series, saying, "like a lot of great art, Reservation Dogs challenges its audience with wit and style to look in spaces that have long been ignored, and identify with experiences that are outside their own." Writing for IGN, Matt Fowler said, "Reservation Dogs features characters we like, a community we're drawn to (and may be curious about)." Esther Zuckerman of Thrillist praised the series' tone, stating that "Reservation Dogs is at times melancholy, and at times deeply irreverent. But whatever mood it's going for at any given moment, it's some of the most unique, enjoyable, and artistically satisfying television available to watch."

The American Film Institute named it one of the ten best television programs of the year.

Season 2
The second season also received critical acclaim. On Rotten Tomatoes, it holds a "Certified Fresh" approval rating of 100%, with an average score of 8.9 out of 10, based on 23 reviews. The site's critical consensus reads: "Reservation Dogs has bittersweet bite in its sophomore season as it mines more difficult dilemmas than before with its spiky sense of humor, making for a piquant portrait of a community and a place." On Metacritic, it holds a score of 93 out of 100, based on 16 reviews, indicating "universal acclaim".

Critics were given the first four episodes prior to its premiere to review. It received an "A" from Manuel Betancourt of The A.V. Club and Chase Hutchinson of Collider, an "A-" from Darren Franich of Entertainment Weekly and Brian Tallerico of The Playlist, and a "B+" from Kristen Lopez of IndieWire. Betancourt highlighted the way it treats dark materials, such as generational trauma, wounding grief, and systemic inequities, with "winsome humor", without going too far. Hutchinson praised the writing, humor, and performances, particularly Jacobs' and Woon-A-Tai's. Daniel Fienberg of The Hollywood Reporter also praised the performances and further singled out Jacobs', particularly in the episode "Mabel". Kristen Reid of Paste gave it a 9.3 out of 10 and said, "Just a season and a half in, Harjo and co-creator Taika Waititi have already found their groove with Reservation Dogs. Inviting us onto the reservation to experience it with this group of quickly beloved kids, [It] feels like a celebration of Native life and a way to inspire change for the better."

Varietys Caroline Framke wrote in her favorable review: "for the hundreds of shows premiering every year, there's still simply nothing else on TV quite like 'Reservation Dogs'. [It] gives voice, time, and flawed dirtbag humanity to Indigenous Americans, who have long been little more onscreen than one-note punchlines. But it also does so with an approach that could only have come from these writers, actors, directors and production crew members. This is a show so self-assured in its own voice and perspective that it's not just gratifying to watch, but a welcome relief." Joe Keller of Decider summarized his review by saying, "Reservation Dogs improves on its excellent first season by deepening the community on the rez, making it less about the Dogs and more about traditions, people who think they know the traditions but don't, and just how funny and rich life there can be, even if people have to be creative to get by."

For the season finale, TVLine named Woon-A-Tai, Jacobs, Factor and Alexis the "Performers of the Week" for the week of October 1, 2022. The site wrote: "No single actor outshined the others; rather, it was their combined chemistry and the characters’ reliance on each other that made us laugh at their antics and reel in their heartbreak. [...] Jacobs exhibited a wealth of vulnerability in her body language and diction as Elora admitted her fear of letting Daniel go. Woon-A-Tai was brought to tears, as Bear was consumed by love for his friends. Alexis displayed a wealth of fortitude as Willie Jack proved to be both the Dogs' safety net and comedic relief. And after they joined together for a prayer, Factor quivered and choked on his emotions as Cheese revealed his lingering anger."

Like the first season, the American Film Institute named it one of the ten best television programs of the year.

Critics' top ten list

Accolades

References

External links
 Reservation Dogs on FX
 Reservation Dogs on Hulu
 
 Sterlin Harjo Is Not Afraid to Sacrifice a Good Idea – Interview with Reservation Dogs co-creator and showrunner

2020s American comedy-drama television series
2020s American teen drama television series
2021 American television series debuts
English-language television shows
FX on Hulu original programming
Television series about teenagers
Television shows filmed in Oklahoma
Television shows set in Oklahoma
Television shows about Native Americans